Elgin County is a county of the Canadian province of Ontario with a 2016 population of 50,069. Its population centres are St. Thomas, Aylmer, Port Stanley, Belmont, Dutton and West Lorne. The county seat is St. Thomas, which is separated from the county but within its geographic boundary.

Subdivisions
Elgin County is composed of seven incorporated municipalities (in order of population):
Municipality of Central Elgin
Township of Malahide  
Town of Aylmer  
Municipality of Bayham  
Municipality of West Elgin 
Township of Southwold
Municipality of Dutton/Dunwich

The City of St. Thomas is geographically within the boundaries of Elgin County and part of the Elgin census division, but is separated from county administration.

Historical townships 

Originally Elgin County was once part of Middlesex County, which was reorganized as the United Counties of Middlesex and Elgin in 1851. Elgin was named after Lord Elgin, who was Governor-General of Canada at the time.

The County was separated from Middlesex in September 1853.

Demographics

Notable persons from Elgin County
 Horace Harvey - Chief Justice of Alberta
 John Kenneth Galbraith - Canadian/American economist
 Mitchell Hepburn - Premier of Ontario
 Rachel McAdams - Actress
 Joe Thornton - NHL  - Professional Hockey Player
 Bo Horvat - NHL  - Professional Hockey Player

See also
 List of municipalities in Ontario
 List of Ontario Census Divisions
 Talbot Trail
 Southern Ontario
 List of townships in Ontario
 List of secondary schools in Ontario#Elgin County

Notes

References

External links

 
Counties in Ontario
Populated places on Lake Erie in Canada
Southwestern Ontario